The 1998 Beach Soccer World Championships was the fourth edition of the Beach Soccer World Championships, the most prestigious competition in international beach soccer contested by men's national teams until 2005, when the competition was then replaced by the second iteration of a world cup in beach soccer, the better known FIFA Beach Soccer World Cup. It was organised by Brazilian sports agency Koch Tavares (one of the founding partners of Beach Soccer Worldwide). 

The tournament continued to take place at Copacabana Beach in Rio de Janeiro, Brazil. For the first time, the number of teams competing was raised, from eight to ten. This change saw the longest group stage until the world cup became a 16-team event in 2006.

Brazil, the three-time defending champions, successfully defended their title again to win their fourth World Championship by beating France 9–2 in the final. This was the first time a European nation appeared in the final of the World Championship.

Organisation
The number of teams competing this year was increased to ten which meant necessary alterations to the past organisational structure of the tournament.

The nations were split into two groups, just as in previous editions, however this time since ten nations were competing instead of eight, both groups consisted of five nations rather than four. The countries competed in a round robin format. The top two teams then progressed to the semi finals from which point onward the championship was played as a knock-out tournament until a winner was crowned, with an additional match to determine third place.

Teams
Africa, Asia and Oceania were unrepresented.

European Zone (4):
1

North American Zone (1):

South American Zone (4):

1
1

Hosts:
 (South America)

Group stage

Group A

Group B

Note: 
Portugal, the United States and Uruguay were tied on 6 points each and one win against each other in their head-to-head records
Uruguay progressed based on having the best goal difference in the head-to-head results (URU +1, POR 0, USA –1)

Knockout stage

Semi-finals

Third place play-off

Final

Winners

Awards

Final standings

Sources

RSSSF
Roonba

1998
1998
1998 in beach soccer
1998 in Brazilian football